Hyun-mi, also spelled Hyun-mee, is a Korean feminine given name. Its meaning differs based on the hanja used to write each syllable of the name. There are 35 hanja with the reading "hyun" and 33 hanja with the reading "mi" on the South Korean government's official list of hanja which may be registered for use in given names.
 
People with this name include:
Joo Hyun-mi (born 1961), South Korean trot singer
Kim Hyun-mee (politician) (born 1962), South Korean politician
Kim Hyun-mee (born 1967), South Korean team handball player
Son Hyeon-mi (born 1972), South Korean judo practitioner
Oh Hyun-mi (born 1986), South Korean volleyball player
Choi Hyunmi (born 1990), North Korean-born boxer who defected to South Korea

See also
List of Korean given names

References

Korean feminine given names